Quercus welshii, the wavy leaf oak, shinnery oak, or Tucker oak, is a North American species of shrub in the (beech family) found in the Colorado Plateau and Canyonlands region of the southwestern United States.

Description

Growth pattern

Roots, stems, and leaves
The plant has an elaborate root system, anchoring it in sandy soils and helping stabilize soils in sandy desert scrub communities.

The leaves are elliptical or lance-shaped with 6–10 lobes along the margins and pointed tips, sometimes with lobes and teeth.

Inflorescence and fruit
Quercus welshii blooms from March to June.

Male and female flowers are in separate hanging clusters.

Taxonomy 
The species was first described by Stanley Larson Welsh in 1986 as Quercus havardii var. tuckeri. It was raised to a full species by R.A. Denham in 2003 using the replacement name Quercus welshii, named after Welsh, as the name Quercus tuckeri had already been used for a fossil species. Quercus welshii has been included within Quercus havardii, but both morphological and molecular evidence suggests that it is distinct. Quercus welshii is not included in a 2017 list of Quercus species by subgenus and section, but Quercus havardii is placed in Quercus sect. Quercus.

Distribution and habitat 
Quercus welshii can be found in sand desert shrub communities, and sandy soils of blackbrush scrub and pinyon–juniper woodland communities in Arizona, Utah, western Colorado, and northwestern New Mexico.

References

 photo of herbarium specimen at Missouri Botanical Garden, collected in Utah in 1985

welshii
Flora of the Colorado Plateau and Canyonlands region
Plants described in 1986
Flora without expected TNC conservation status